European Union Advisory Mission Ukraine (EUAM Ukraine) is a civilian Common Security & Defence Policy (CSDP) mission of the European Union. It aims to assist Ukrainian authorities to reform civilian security sector. It provides strategic advice and practical support to make Ukrainian civilian security sector more effective, efficient, transparent and enjoying public trust. EUAM Ukraine works with a number of law enforcement and rule of law institutions of Ukraine, and it formally began operation on 1 December 2014, following Ukrainian Government's request.

EUAM Ukraine employs over 300 personnel that operate in Kyiv, Lviv, Odesa, Kharkiv and Mariupol implementing its "mission mandate" according to such three main pillars of activity:
 Strategic advice
 Hands-on advice and training for the Ukrainian partners
 Cooperation and coordination with Ukrainian and international counterparts and stakeholders

EUAM Priorities 
National and state security EUAM Ukraine helps to reform security and intelligence institutions to bring them under democratic oversight
Organised and cross-border crime  EUAM Ukraine helps enhance Ukraine’s capacity to fight crime and further develop Integrated Border Management (IBM)
Community safety and police management  EUAM Ukraine helps promote trust between police and communities through dialogue and professional police services
Criminal justice  EUAM Ukraine helps Ukraine to build effective investigation, prosecution and judiciary infrastructure so that justice is served
Digital transformation and innovation  EUAM Ukraine engages in bringing digital and innovative solutions to governance and human resource in Ukraine

Cross-cutting issues 
Having identified the five priorities above that affect Ukrainian partners working in Ukraine's civilian security sector in a different way, EUAM Ukraine identified three "cross-cutting issues" that play part in each of the Five Priorities and are relevant to all civilian security sector agencies. These cross-cutting issues are:
Human Rights & Gender Equality  Human rights perspective and gender mainstreaming are an essential part of EUAM Ukraine's advice to Ukrainian partners working in civilian security sector, in particular the police.
Anti-Corruption  As corruption is widely considered the biggest obstacle to the reform in Ukraine, EUAM Ukraine aims to enhance anti-corruption capacities of Ukraine's law-enforcement agencies and the judiciary. In this regard, EUAM Ukraine assists the newly established anti-corruption agencies of Ukraine (NABU, SAPO and NAPC)
 Good Governance  EUAM Ukraine's objective is to make sure that EU principles of good governance - openness, participation, accountability, effectiveness and coherence - are reflected in the advice and support provided by the Mission

Heads of Mission 
The current Head of Mission since 1 July 2019 is Antti Juhani Hartikainen.

Previous Heads of Mission were:
 Kestutis Lancinskas (February 2016 – May 2019)
 Kálmán Mizsei (August 2014 – January 2016)

Field Offices 
When the Mission was launched in 2014, it operated from its HQ in Kyiv. As the activities were expanding and number of projects carried out by EUAM Ukraine in the regions increased, two Field Offices (FO) - in Kharkiv and Lviv - were established. In 2018, field office in Odesa and a Mobile Unit that operates across the country were added to support EUAM commitments in the regions. A second Mobile Unit that operated in Mariupol was established in 2019, which, in June 2020, transformed into EUAM Field Office Mariupol to solidify EUAM's expanding activities in the east of Ukraine.

Main interlocutors 

 Ministry of Internal Affairs (MoIA) and its agencies (National Police, Patrol Police, State Border Guard Service etc.)
 Security Service (SSU)
 General Prosecutor's Office (GPO), as well as
 judiciary authorities and anti-corruption bodies (NABU, SAPO, SBI).

Main achievements 
Some of key EUAM Ukraine achievements in the Civilian Security Sector reform include contributing to:

 drafting strategic documents (among them Law on National Security, Ministry of Internal Affairs of Ukraine's Development Strategy 2020, Witness Protection Program, Security Service of Ukraine Reform Concept and Action Plan)
 introduction of a community policing concept into police work
 introduction and promotion of a new approach to public order through police training
 assistance in development of the Serious and Organised Crime Threat Assessment (SOCTA) programme to help fight serious and organised crime
 restructuring the work of police criminal investigation departments by merging investigators and operatives etc.

See also 
European Union Military Assistance Mission in support of Ukraine

References

External links 

EUAM Ukraine | EUAM Ukraine
European Union External Action Service

Military and civilian missions of the European Union